Park Hee-von (born Park Jae-young; May 11, 1983) is a South Korean actress, singer and model. Park made her entertainment debut in 2001 as a member of a girl group named M.I.L.K. under S.M. Entertainment's short-lived subsidiary BM Entertainment. The quartet released one album titled With Freshness, and disbanded less than two years later. When Park transitioned to acting, she began using the stage name Park Hee-von. Park is best known for starring in independent films and cable TV series.

Personal life
Park and director Yoon Se-yeong got married in a private wedding at the Myeongdong Cathedral in Seoul on June 6, 2016.

Filmography

Film

Television series

Web series

Music video

Variety/radio show

Theater

Discography

References

External links 

1983 births
SM Entertainment artists
IHQ (company) artists
Living people
South Korean film actresses
South Korean television actresses
South Korean stage actresses
South Korean pop singers
South Korean women pop singers
South Korean female idols
South Korean female models
K-pop singers
Sejong University alumni
Actresses from Seoul
Singers from Seoul
Models from Seoul
21st-century South Korean actresses
21st-century South Korean singers
21st-century South Korean women singers